Eduardo Bailey Elizondo (born 14 October 1961) is a Mexican politician affiliated with the Institutional Revolutionary Party (PRI) who has served in the lower house of the Mexican Congress.

In 2000 Bailey was designated municipal president (mayor) of the municipality of Escobedo when the municipal president, Abel Guerra, left that position seeking a seat in the Congress. In 2003 Bailey was elected federal deputy to serve in the LIX Legislature of the Mexican Congress.

In 2006 he was the PRI candidate to municipal president of San Nicolás for the municipal election held on July 2 he lost the election against the PAN candidate Zeferino Salgado.

References

External links
 Eduardo Bailey at Legislative Information System

Living people
1961 births
Municipal presidents in Nuevo León
Institutional Revolutionary Party politicians
Members of the Chamber of Deputies (Mexico)
Mexican people of British descent
21st-century Mexican politicians
Politicians from Monterrey
Autonomous University of Nuevo León alumni